Jiroft University of Medical Sciences is a medical sciences university in Jiroft, Kerman, Iran. The university has four schools including medicine, health, para-medicine, and nursing & midwifery.

References

External links
Official website

Jiroft County
Medical schools in Iran